The Souhegan River is a tributary of the Merrimack River in the northeastern United States.
The river begins in New Ipswich, New Hampshire, at the junction of the river's South Branch and West Branch.  Flowing northeast, it passes through the center of Greenville and descends through a narrow valley to Wilton, where it turns east.  The river valley broadens below Wilton, and the river passes through the center of Milford, crosses the southern portion of Amherst, and enters the town of Merrimack.  Shortly upstream of the town center, the river passes over Wildcat Falls, then crosses under the Everett Turnpike and U.S. Route 3 to reach the Merrimack River.

The river is used for water supplies, a small amount of hydropower, and recreation. There are 28 threatened or endangered species sharing the watershed with 35,000 people. It is part of the New Hampshire Rivers Management Protection Program.

It was one of two rivers studied by the New Hampshire Department of Environmental Services to reach data and recommendations about allowable "instream flow".

Etymology
The name "Souhegan" comes from the language of the Native American Algonquins, meaning "waiting and watching place".  Tribal fishermen set weirs across the rapids, and then waited and watched for fish, including salmon, alewives, sturgeon, and eels.

Souhegan High School, which serves the towns of Amherst and Mont Vernon, is named after the river.

The name of Skowhegan, Maine, comes from the same term.

See also

 List of rivers of New Hampshire

References

External links
 Souhegan Watershed Association
 Souhegan River river gauge—United States Geological Survey

Rivers of Hillsborough County, New Hampshire
Rivers of New Hampshire
Tributaries of the Merrimack River
New Hampshire placenames of Native American origin